Ola Jonsson (born 3 November 1966) is a former professional tennis player from Sweden. He enjoyed most of his tennis success while playing doubles.  During his career, he won two doubles titles and finished runner-up an additional two times. He achieved a career-high doubles ranking of world No. 90 in 1991.

Career finals

Doubles (2 wins, 2 losses)

External links
 
 

Tennis players from Stockholm
Swedish male tennis players
Living people
1966 births